The band-bellied crake (Zapornia paykullii) is a species of bird in the family Rallidae.
It breeds in Manchuria, eastern China and northern Korea ; it winters throughout Southeast Asia.

It is getting rare due to habitat loss.

In 1813 the Swedish taxon author Sven Ingemar Ljungh named the bird after the naturalist Gustaf von Paykull.

References

band-bellied crake
Birds of Manchuria
Birds of Korea
band-bellied crake
Taxa named by Sven Ingemar Ljungh
Taxonomy articles created by Polbot